Broadbill may refer to the bird families:
the Eurylaimidae, a family of birds known as the Asian and Grauer’s broadbills
the Calyptomenidae, a family of birds known as the African and green broadbills

Broadbill may also refer to:
Broadbills, a common alternate name for monarch flycatchers in the genus Myiagra
An alternate name for the lesser scaup, a North American duck
An alternate name for the swordfish
, the name of two United States Navy ships